Clifton Place may refer to:

Clifton Place (Columbia, Tennessee), listed on the National Register of Historic Places in Maury County, Tennessee
Clifton Place (Wales, Tennessee), listed on the National Register of Historic Places in Giles County, Tennessee